Heathcote was a 19th-century parliamentary electorate in Christchurch, New Zealand.

Population centres
The electorate was based on the Heathcote Valley suburb.

History

Heathcote existed from 1861 to 1893.

George Williamson Hall resigned in 1862.

John Hall, the younger brother of George and who was later to become the 12th Premier, won the  against George Buckley and represented Heathcote until 1872, when he resigned due to health reasons.

James Fisher the represented the electorate over the next two terms, from 1876 to 1881. The  was won by Frederic Jones. Jones was confirmed in the  a few months later.

He defeated Heaton Rhodes in his first attempt to enter Parliament.

Members of Parliament
Key

Election results

1890 election

1887 by-election
The following table gives the election result:

1866 election

References

1860 establishments in New Zealand
1893 disestablishments in New Zealand
Historical electorates of New Zealand
Politics of Christchurch
History of Christchurch